Frederick Pusey may refer to:

 Fred Pusey (1909–1983), British film art director and production designer
 Frederick Taylor Pusey (1872–1936), politician from Pennsylvania